Xuban Errazkin Pérez (born 25 August 1996 in Usurbil) is a Spanish cyclist, who last rode for UCI Continental team .

Major results
2016
 1st Stage 1 Volta a Portugal do Futuro
2018
 4th Overall Grand Prix Priessnitz spa
 5th Overall Vuelta Ciclista Comunidad de Madrid
1st  Young rider classification
 10th Overall GP Beiras e Serra da Estrela

References

External links

1996 births
Spanish male cyclists
Living people
People from Usurbil
Sportspeople from Gipuzkoa
Cyclists from the Basque Country (autonomous community)